I'm a Man may refer to:

Film 
I'm a Man (film), a 1918 film directed by King Vidor

Songs 
"I'm a Man" (Bo Diddley song), 1955
"I'm a Man" (Michelle Branch song), 2022
"I'm a Man" (The Spencer Davis Group song), 1967; covered by the band Chicago in 1970
"I'm a Man", a 1959 song by Fabian
"I'm a Man", a 1998 song by Pulp from the album This Is Hardcore